Kurtis Matthew Kenneth Conner (born May 4, 1994) is a Canadian comedian, YouTuber, and podcaster. As of January 2023, his four YouTube channels have collectively amassed over  million subscribers and over  million views.

Early life
Kurtis Matthew Kenneth Conner was born at North York General Hospital in the North York district of Toronto on May 4, 1994. He briefly lived in nearby Hamilton before moving back to Toronto. He first performed stand-up comedy in 2013, at the age of 19, and later joined Humber College's Comedy Writing and Performance program.

Career

Vine
Conner joined the six-second video platform Vine in 2013, and gained about 350,000 followers for his comedy videos before Vine was shut down in 2017.

Stand-up comedy
Conner began performing stand-up shows all over Canada in 2013. He self-released his debut comedy album Cuppla Jokes in 2016, which reached No. 1 on the iTunes comedy charts and No. 6 on the Billboard comedy charts. In 2019, he was a special guest and opening act for his friends and fellow YouTubers Danny Gonzalez and Drew Gooden during their We Are Two Different People Tour.

YouTube
The first video on Conner's main channel was uploaded in 2014. The channel began to gain momentum in 2017, when one of his videos gained 600,000 views in two days. His channel has become known for his critique of content perceived as problematic on YouTube, and for making fun of those who wish to marginalize groups of people. In 2019, he and his friend and fellow comedian Jacob Sharpe criticised TikToker Sebastian Bails and Bails' girlfriend Lauren Godwin for making light of domestic abuse on their YouTube channel. Conner and Sharpe were both disturbed by the content, frequently commenting in the video that they found it difficult to make light of such a serious subject. Conner later said he would raise $10,000 for the domestic abuse charity loveisrespect and then match it with his own donation, with over $16,000 being raised and Conner making a donation of $26,000 overall.

Conner also criticised a "female Viagra" trend on YouTube, which involved YouTubers administering a claimed aphrodisiac for women by spiking their girlfriend's drink without their consent. His video was later removed from YouTube as it showed the controversial behaviour, although other "female Viagra" videos were still available on the platform at the time.

Conner has made more lighthearted videos, and says that his favorite content is film criticism. He has made content about the TikTok Hype House, manipulative tactics used by Justin Bieber's team to promote his song "Yummy", the 22 Convention (a "convention for women" run by anti-feminist men's rights activists), and pick-up artist Russell Hartley (whom Conner dubbed "misogynist of the year").

During the COVID-19 pandemic, Conner posted a video detailing how to become famous online. In April 2021, he and Gonzalez produced the song "In Love With a Creeper", which features them competing for the affections of (and eventually having a threesome with) a creeper from the video game Minecraft.

Personal life
Conner started dating Jenna Allard on December 11, 2014. The two were married in Tuscany on October 19, 2022. They have a dog named Kiwi.

Filmography

Discography

Albums

Singles

As featured artist

Notes

References 

1994 births
Living people
Canadian male comedians
Canadian YouTubers
Canadian atheists
Comedians from Toronto
Comedy YouTubers
Commentary YouTubers
YouTube channels launched in 2014
People from North York
Vine (service) celebrities
YouTube vloggers
21st-century Canadian comedians